Preston Xavier Burke, M.D., F.A.C.S is a fictional character from the medical drama television series Grey's Anatomy, which airs on ABC in the United States. The character was created by series producer Shonda Rhimes, and was portrayed by actor Isaiah Washington from 2005 to 2007. Introduced as an attending cardiothoracic surgeon at the fictional Seattle Grace Hospital, Burke's romantic relationship with intern Cristina Yang formed one of the main storylines in the shows' first three seasons.

Burke made his final appearance in the third season, leaving Seattle in the aftermath of his failed wedding. In 2007, Isaiah Washington (Preston Burke) insulted a co-star with a homophobic slur, which resulted in the termination of Washington's Grey's Anatomy contract. On June 7, 2007, ABC announced the decision not to renew Washington's contract, and that he would be dropped from the show after an on-set incident with fellow cast members T. R. Knight and Patrick Dempsey.

While mentioned in passing throughout later seasons, Burke officially returns in the tenth season in order to conclude Cristina Yang's departure from the series.

Storylines

Preston Burke is the former chief cardiothoracic surgeon at Seattle Grace Hospital. He completed his pre-medical studies at Tulane University where he pledged Kappa Alpha Psi, and went on to graduate first in his class from Johns Hopkins School of Medicine. While in college, he met Erica Hahn (Brooke Smith), who graduated in second place after him, beginning a rivalry between them. He was once the interim chief of surgery while Dr. Richard Webber (James Pickens, Jr.) was healing from his brain surgery. In season 1, it is revealed that Richard had promised him the position but instead enticed his former student, renowned neurosurgeon Derek Shepherd (Patrick Dempsey), to Seattle as he felt Burke was becoming arrogant and needed competition to keep him on his toes. He began a relationship with intern Cristina Yang (Sandra Oh) but broke it off because he feared it would ruin both of their reputations. Her miscarriage brought them back together. He and Cristina lived together in his perfectly kept apartment.

Towards the end of the second season, he was shot, which affected his control of his right-hand. His temporary fix to this possibly long-term problem was to work together with Cristina during every one of his surgeries so that she could take over in case he might have trouble with his hand. The arrangement fell apart after Cristina, reacting to growing stress after George O'Malley (T. R. Knight) caught onto their secret, went to the Chief and confessed everything. Initially, he was engaged in a cold war with Cristina, where neither of them spoke. However, after she broke the silence, he proposed to her and she accepted his proposal. Before their secret was revealed, Burke was to become the next Chief of Surgery, but he had to compete with his fellow attendings for the position. He has since recovered from the injury, after Derek operated on him. For the remainder of the season, Preston and Cristina prepared for the wedding and experienced normal stresses that result from such a process, such as meeting each other's parents.

However, in the finale of season three, on the day of their wedding, Burke told Cristina that he no longer wished to make her do anything against her will, and realized he was trying to make Cristina the woman he wanted her to be, and not accept her as the woman she is. Cristina said she "thought this was what she wanted." He wanted her to say she knew it was what she wanted, so he left her in the chapel. Cristina then returned to their apartment and discovered Burke had left, taking with him the things that meant something to only him (his trumpet, his Eugene Foote collection, his grandmother's picture, and his lucky scrub cap), leaving Cristina devastated.

In the fourth season, Preston's long-time rival and love-to-hate medic Dr. Erica Hahn replaced him as the head of cardiothoracic surgery. Before taking over the position she had tremendous respect for Burke although she would have never admitted it to his face. Hahn disliked Cristina Yang because of her relationships with Dr. Burke and Colin Marlowe. During his employment at a new hospital, he is made the recipient of 2008's Harper Avery, a highly prestigious medical award. Cristina is later hurt that he did not mention her in his article, even though Cristina helped Burke with his recovery from his hand injury.

In season ten, Preston is seen to be living in Zürich, where he runs a privately owned cardiothoracic research hospital. He invited Cristina to the hospital to give a speech on her research. Cristina is both shocked and angered by the sight of Preston, and the former couple exchange bitter sentiments. Cristina claims that the two would never have worked out because she wanted to emulate him, not be by his side. Preston then reveals his ulterior motive for bringing Cristina to Switzerland: to ask her to take over his hospital, which she accepts. He is married to an Italian woman, Edra, and has two daughters, Simone and Vivianna. They are on the verge of moving to Milán.

Development

Casting and creation 

The character of Preston Burke was originally envisioned as a caucasian, to be played by Paul Adelstein, who starred in Grey's Anatomy spin-off Private Practice. However, due to his commitment to a film whose shooting dates changed, the actor had to drop out at the last moment and his character was rethought. Isaiah Washington was originally considered for the role of Derek Shepherd, which eventually went to Patrick Dempsey. Washington later received a callback from Rhimes to play Burke. He commented: "I knew I could never be wrong in my heart about something so good and so genuine. Her writing just seemed very complex, very honest." "I said that I would only do it if I didn't have to be like that guy on that other medical show who was always struggling with his anger."

Shonda Rhimes noted Washington's commitment to his role, revealing that he learns all his surgeries before he performs them on television. "I think if he stopped at an accident on the street, he'd know exactly what to do. He has pulled shifts at hospitals where he follows the surgeons around for 48 hours". At the beginning of the series, Burke is one of the three African American characters, along with Miranda Bailey (Chandra Wilson) and Richard Webber (James Pickens, Jr.).

In the show's third season, Washington became a central figure in a widely reported backstage controversy. In October 2006, news reports surfaced that Washington had insulted co-star T.R. Knight with a homophobic slur. Shortly after the details of the argument became public, Knight publicly disclosed that he was gay. The situation seemed somewhat resolved when Washington issued a statement, apologizing for his "unfortunate use of words during the recent incident on-set." The controversy later resurfaced when the cast appeared at the Golden Globes in January 2007. While being interviewed on the red carpet prior to the awards, Washington joked, "I love gay. I wanted to be gay. Please let me be gay." After the show won Best Drama, Washington, in response to press queries as to any conflicts backstage, said, "I never called T.R. a faggot." However, in an interview with Ellen DeGeneres on The Ellen DeGeneres Show, Knight said that "everybody heard him." After being rebuked by his studio, Touchstone Television (now ABC Studios), Washington issued a statement apologizing at length for using the epithet in an argument with Patrick Dempsey. On January 30, 2007, a source told People magazine that Washington was scheduled to return to the Grey's Anatomy set as early on that Thursday for the first time since entering "executive counseling" after making the comments at the Golden Globes. However, on June 7, 2007, ABC announced it had decided not to renew Washington's contract, and that he would be dropped from the show. "I'm mad as hell and I'm not going to take it anymore," Washington said in a statement released by his publicist, borrowing the famous line from Network. In another report, Washington stated he was planning to "spend the summer pursuing charity work in Sierra Leone, work on an independent film and avoid worrying about the show." In a subsequent interview, Washington claimed that "they fired the wrong guy" (referring to Knight) and said he was considering filing a lawsuit as a result. He accused Knight of using the controversy to bolster his own career and increase his salary on Grey's Anatomy. Washington, in late June 2007, began asserting that racism within the media was a factor in his firing from the series.  On July 2, 2007, Washington appeared on Larry King Live on CNN, to present his side of the controversy. According to Washington, he never used the "F Word" in reference to Knight, but rather blurted it out in an unrelated context in the course of an argument "provoked" by Dempsey, who, he felt, was treating him like a "B-word," a "P-word," and the "F-word," which Washington said conveyed "somebody who is being weak and afraid to fight back."  Washington himself said that his dismissal from Grey's Anatomy was an unfortunate misunderstanding that he was eager to move past.

On March 6, 2014, Shonda Rhimes announced that Washington would return to his role for one episode airing in May to help conclude Sandra Oh's final storylines as Cristina Yang. Rhimes said of his return, "It's important to me that Cristina's journey unfolds exactly as it should. Burke is vital to that journey -- he gives her story that full-circle moment we need to properly say goodbye to our beloved Cristina Yang."

Characterization 

Washington said of his character: "He did start out sort of stone-faced, but he's evolved into someone we see as an effective leader and someone who learns how to love and be loved." Thanks to Yang, Washington says Burke "has been able to show levels of vulnerability." In an interview with Oprah Winfrey, Rhimes has described Preston as a "mama's boy", and noted the shock the audience felt when discovering that side of his personality after the arrival of his parents. Isaiah Washington also noted Preston's "determination" and "commitment". Rhimes referred to Burke's relationship with Yang by the portmanteau "Burktina", citing "Losing My Religion" as one of her favorite episodes featuring them because it shows their evolution from the beginning of the second season to its end. Ann Oldenburg of USA Today called it "one of the spiciest relationships on TV right now". Drawing a comparison between the two doctors, she said Burke is "tidy" while Yang is "messy"; he is "spiritual" but she is not.

Reception 

Isaiah Washington has been nominated for multiple awards for his portrayal of Preston Burke. He and the Grey's Anatomy cast won Best Ensemble in a Television Series at the 2006 Satellite Awards. He was awarded "Outstanding Actor in a Drama Series" twice at the NAACP Image Awards, in 2006 and 2007. Washington was recognized along with the rest of the cast at the Screen Actors Guild Awards, receiving three nominations for "Outstanding Performance by an Ensemble in a Drama Series" each year from 2006 to 2008, with the 2007 Awards marking a victory. TV Guide named Isaiah Washington "TV's Sexiest Man" in 2006.

Burke's relationship with Cristina Yang was considered "one of the most interesting relationships on the show." Similarly, The Orange County Register wrote that their romance became "one of the most touching and funny attractions of Grey's Anatomy." Oscar Dahl of BuddyTV listed Burke as the fifth most worthless TV character.

References
Specific

General

External links 
Grey's Anatomy at ABC.com

Grey's Anatomy characters
Fictional surgeons
Fictional African-American people
Television characters introduced in 2005
Fictional cardiothoracic surgeons
American male characters in television

mk:Список на ликови од Вовед во анатомија#Престон Бурк